The Sculpture in the Parklands is a  land and environmental sculpture park located in Lough Boora, County Offaly, Ireland. The park is open to the public 365 days of the year and admission is free. 
Sculpture in the Parklands was founded by sculptor Kevin O'Dwyer in partnership with Bord na Mona, Lough Boora Parklands Group, Offaly County Council and the Arts Council.

Site
In the wetlands and wildlife wilderness of Lough Boora, inspired by the rich natural and industrial legacy of the boglands, the artists have created a series of large-scale sculptures that are now part of the Parklands' permanent collection. Sculpture in the Parklands began as an international sculpture symposium in 2002 when seven Irish and international artist created works of art over a three-week residency. The success of the symposium led to the formation of Sculpture in the Parklands and eight site-specific sculptures created during the symposium form the nucleus of the project. Currently there are 20 site specific sculptures in the Parklands.

Mission

Inviting artists to create significant site-specific works of art during the artist in residency programme each year, the mission of Sculpture in the Parklands is to inspire artists to create artworks in response to the unique landscape and industrial heritage of the cut away bogland and to build awareness of the arts within the community through public participation and interaction. In addition to permanent sculpture and time-based work, the project has a commitment to commissioning video artists, composers, choreographers, and performance artists to interpret and document this unique landscape, folklore and industrial history.

Directions
Lough Boora Parklands is centrally located to all the main attractions of County Offaly and the Irish midlands.

From Tullamore: Leave Tullamore on N52 for Birr. At Blueball turn right onto R357 for Cloghan / Shannonbridge. The Parklands commence within 7 km of Blueball.

From Birr: Take N52 towards Tullamore, exit for N62 to Athlone. Continue to Cloghan, turning right off roundabout onto R357. The Parklands commence within 2 km.

Access
Wheelchair access and disabled parking are available at the sculpture park. The Offaly Way passes through the park and bikes are available for rent.

External links
 Irish Times Slideshow
 Sculpture in the Parklands Official Website
 Lough Boora Parklands Website
 Offaly County Council
 Sculpture Park Ireland
 Culture in the cutaway

Gallery

References

Sculpture gardens, trails and parks in Europe
Irish sculpture
Tourist attractions in County Offaly
Art museums established in 2002
2002 establishments in Ireland
Protected areas of County Offaly
Art museums and galleries in Ireland
Buildings and structures in County Offaly